The Gryllotalpoidea are a superfamily of insects that includes the mole crickets and the ant crickets. The type genus is Gryllotalpa.

Recent (2015) molecular phylogenetic studies support the monophyly of the cricket clade (Gryllidea in the Orthoptera Species File) and its subdivision into two clades:  Gryllotalpidae and Myrmecophilidae on the one hand, and all the other crickets (i.e. crickets sensu stricto: seven monophyletic clades, including the scaly crickets Mogoplistidae and Gryllidae).

Families and subfamilies
The Orthoptera Species File lists the following families and subfamilies:
 Gryllotalpidae Leach, 1815 - mole crickets
 Gryllotalpinae Leach, 1815
 †Marchandiinae Gorochov, 2010
 Scapteriscinae Zeuner, 1939
 Myrmecophilidae Saussure, 1874 - ant crickets
 Bothriophylacinae Miram, 1934
 Myrmecophilinae Saussure, 1874

References

Ensifera